Glaucostola flavida is a moth of the family Erebidae first described by William Schaus in 1905. It is found in French Guiana, Guyana and Trinidad.

References

Phaegopterina
Moths of South America
Moths described in 1905